Dare Foods, Limited is a Canada-based food manufacturing company. They have seven factories in Canada and the United States. Their products are distributed in North America and at least 25 other countries.

Company history

In 1892, the founder of Dare Foods, Charles H. Doerr began making and selling cookies and candies in a small grocery shop in Berlin, Ontario, Canada. By 1919, Doerr had created the C.H. Doerr Company, which distributed his goods throughout Ontario. Following Charles's death in 1941, the company was led by his twenty-four-year-old grandson Carl Doerr.  Carl had been raised by his paternal grandparents after both his parents died of the Spanish flu. 

On February 16, 1943, a fire destroyed the company's factory at Weber and Breithaupt in Kitchener, killing nightwatchman Julius Eckstein and risking the future of the company, then known as C.H. Doerr Co. Ltd. Carl quickly moved to rebuild, relocating the same year as the fire to a plot of land on what is today Kingsway Drive in Kitchener.

The name of the company was changed to "Dare" in 1945 because it was easier to pronounce. Dare products became more popular Canada-wide by 1954. and began to be exported to the U.S. in 1956.

Products

Dare is known for adopting the resealable "tin tie" packaging for their cookies in 1954. The resealable bag ensured freshness and soon became the standard packaging for cookies across Canada.

Dare continued to grow rapidly by expanding their product lines and starting new trends in the food industry. Due to the recent awareness of peanut allergies, Dare declared all of its facilities to be "peanut free." They were one of the first large food manufacturers in Canada to do this.

The following is a list of traditional products they make:

Maple Leaf Crème Cookies
Ultimate Coconut Crème Cookies
Bear Paws
Viva Puffs
Whippets
Wagon Wheels
Breton Crackers
Vinta Crackers
RealFruit Gummies and RealFruit Minis
Maxi Fruit
Melba toast
Breaktime Chocolate Chip Cookies

Dare provides snacks for families. A few of their new promoted products are:

Bear Paws Cereal and Fruit
Bear Paws Crackers
Baguettes Bites
Simple Pleasures Moments

Since 2003, they have produced Canada's Girl Guide cookies.

References

External links
 Homepage
 

Food and drink companies of Canada
Companies based in Kitchener, Ontario